Zavety Ilyicha is the name of several inhabited localities in Russia.

Urban localities
Zavety Ilyicha, Khabarovsk Krai, a work settlement in Sovetsko-Gavansky District of Khabarovsk Krai

Rural localities
Zavety Ilyicha, Altai Krai, a settlement in Zavetilyichevsky Selsoviet of Aleysky District in Altai Krai; 
Zavety Ilyicha, Republic of Bashkortostan, a village in Austrumsky Selsoviet of Iglinsky District in the Republic of Bashkortostan; 
Zavety Ilyicha, Krasnodar Krai, a settlement in Pervomaysky Rural Okrug of Kushchyovsky District in Krasnodar Krai; 
Zavety Ilyicha, Saratov Oblast, a selo in Engelssky District of Saratov Oblast
Zavety Ilyicha, Smolensk Oblast, a village in Astapkovichskoye Rural Settlement of Roslavlsky District in Smolensk Oblast

Abolished localities
Zavety Ilyicha, Moscow Oblast, a former suburban settlement in Pushkinsky District of Moscow Oblast, Russia; since July 2003—a part of the city of Pushkino